Herdi is an Kurdish male given name. Notable people with the name include:

 Herdi Noor Al-Deen (born 1992), Kurdish football player
 Herdi Prenga (born 1994), Albanian-Croatian football player
 Herdi Siamand (born 1983), Iraqi football player

Arabic masculine given names